King George V Dock is one of three docks in the Royal Docks of east London, now part of the redeveloped Docklands.

History
Begun in 1912 by the Port of London Authority, the King George V was the last of London's upstream enclosed docks to be built. After delay by the First World War, construction was completed in 1921. At its western end was a large graving dock (since filled in) and machine shop used for ship repairs by Harland and Wolff. From the 1960s onwards, the King George V Dock experienced a steady decline – as did all of London's other docks – as the shipping industry adopted containerisation, which effectively moved traffic downstream to Tilbury. It finally closed to commercial traffic along with the other Royal Docks in 1981.

Redevelopment in the late 20th century included the construction of London City Airport which was built on the north bank of the dock with a single runway and completed in 1987. King George V station on the London City Airport branch of the Docklands Light Railway, which opened in December 2005, is named after the dock.

References

Further reading

 

London docks
Buildings and structures in the London Borough of Newham
Geography of the London Borough of Newham
Port of London